Phenethyl alcohol, or 2-phenylethanol, is the organic compound that consists of a phenethyl group (C6H5CH2CH2) attached to OH. It is a colourless liquid that is slightly soluble in water (2 ml/100 ml H2O), but miscible with most organic solvents.  It occurs widely in nature, being found in a variety of essential oils.  It has a pleasant floral odor.

Synthesis 
Phenethyl alcohol is prepared commercially via two routes. Most common is the Friedel-Crafts reaction between benzene and ethylene oxide in the presence of aluminium trichloride.  
C6H6 + CH2CH2O + AlCl3 → C6H5CH2CH2OAlCl2 + HCl 
The reaction affords the aluminium alkoxide that is subsequently hydrolyzed to the desired product. The main side product is diphenylethane, which can be avoided by use of excess benzene. Hydrogenation of styrene oxide also affords phenethyl alcohol.

Laboratory methods
Phenethyl alcohol can also be prepared by the reaction between phenylmagnesium bromide and ethylene oxide:
C6H5MgBr + CH2CH2O → C6H5CH2CH2OMgBr
C6H5CH2CH2OMgBr + H+ → C6H5CH2CH2OH
Phenethyl alcohol can also be produced by biotransformation from L-phenylalanine using immobilized yeast Saccharomyces cerevisiae. It is also possible to produce phenethyl alcohol by the reduction of phenylacetic acid using sodium borohydride and iodine in THF.

Occurrence and uses
Phenethyl alcohol is found in extract of rose, carnation, hyacinth, Aleppo pine, orange blossom, ylang-ylang, geranium, neroli, and champaca. It is also an autoantibiotic produced by the fungus Candida albicans.

It is therefore a common ingredient in flavors and perfumery, particularly when the odor of rose is desired. It is used as an additive in cigarettes. It is also used as a preservative in soaps due to its stability in basic conditions. It is of interest due to its antimicrobial properties.

See also 
 1-Phenylethanol
 Congener
 Wine chemistry
 Phenethylamine

References 

Flavors
Perfume ingredients
Primary alcohols
Phenyl compounds